Robbie Widdows (born 17 January 1961) is an English former professional darts player who played in events of the British Darts Organisation (BDO) and Professional Darts Corporation (PDC).

Career
Widdows played in three BDO World Championships but never got past the last 16. He took part in the 2004 PDC World Championship, defeating Henry O'Neill in the last 48 before losing to Simon Whatley in the last 40.

Widdows participated in the Las Vegas Desert Classic who beating Les Hodkinson of England and losing in the Last 24 to Alan Warriner-Little of England.

World Championship performances

BDO
 1998: Last 16 (lost to Colin Monk 2–3) (sets) 
 1999: Last 32 (lost to Kevin Painter 0–3)
 2000: Last 16 (lost to Kevin Painter 1–3)

PDC
 2004: Last 40 (lost to Simon Whatley 1–3)

References

External links

English darts players
Professional Darts Corporation former pro tour players
British Darts Organisation players
1961 births
Living people